In September 2004, Hurricane Ivan caused significant effects in the Lesser Antilles and South America, including 44 deaths and over $1 billion in damage (2004 USD), primarily in Grenada where it was considered the worst hurricane in nearly 50 years.

In the region, the worst damage occurred on Grenada, where the damage total of $1.1 billion (2004 USD, ($  USD)) represented 200% of its GDP. The hurricane damaged more than 14,000 homes and destroyed 30% of the houses, leaving about 18,000 people homeless. A total of 39 people were killed by the hurricane on the island. Elsewhere, Hurricane Ivan caused at least three fatalities and moderate damage in northern Venezuela. One person died each in Trinidad and Barbados. The name Ivan was later retired.

Preparations
Early in the duration of the storm, the National Hurricane Center consistently forecast Ivan to track further to the north than it eventually did. Late on September 5, the government of Barbados issued a hurricane watch for its territory. Shortly thereafter, Saint Lucia was put under a hurricane watch and Grenada and its dependencies were put under a tropical storm watch. As the hurricane approached the southern Lesser Antilles, more watches were issued, and by 24 hours prior to Ivan passing through the island chain a hurricane warning was in effect for Barbados, Saint Vincent and the Grenadines, Saint Lucia, Tobago, and Grenada, and a tropical storm warning was in effect for Trinidad. With the path of Ivan more southerly than predicted, the hurricane warnings were downgraded to tropical storm warnings for the northern islands, and by late on September 7 when the eye of the hurricane passed near Grenada, hurricane warnings were in effect for Saint Vincent and the Grenadines, Trinidad and Tobago, and Grenada. Subsequently, a tropical storm warning was issued for the northern coast of Venezuela through the Guajira Peninsula of Colombia.

In Venezuela, citizens in coastal areas of Falcón, Sucre and Isla Margarita were moved to safer areas, and several thousands were evacuated due to the hurricane. The Simón Bolívar International Airport, as well as three other mainland airports, were closed. Petróleos de Venezuela S.A. temporarily closed its oil refinery in Curaçao, and two ports were briefly shut down; this caused a delay in two oil deliveries. The Valero Energy Corporation shut down its largest oil refinery in Aruba. Prior to the arrival of the hurricane, oil companies in Trinidad and Tobago ceased production and removed workers from offshore rigs; the Atlantic LNG company closed exports. Seven shelters were opened on Tobago, where about 560 people evacuated for the storm. Two people died: one man trying to save his car, and one girl sleeping in her bed, when a tree fell on the roof above her room. Most evacuees were from low-lying areas, and on the day of the storm's passage most schools and businesses were closed. The two main airports in the country were closed, with one airline canceling all of its flights.

Over 1,000 people evacuated to emergency shelters on Grenada, including hundreds in low-lying areas in the capital city. Some shelters were damaged during the hurricane, forcing the evacuees to go elsewhere. Overall, the population responded little to the official advisories and recommendations, which potentially contributed to the death toll on the island. More than 1,000 residents of Saint Vincent and the Grenadines evacuated to 28 emergency shelters. On Barbados, officials closed schools and government buildings and prepared shelters prior to the arrival of the hurricane. To minimize danger, the island power grid was shut down. Four shelters opened on Saint Lucia, where many people sought safety during the storm.

Impact

Venezuela, Trinidad and Tobago, and the ABC islands
Rough waves capsized 10 boats and closed several beaches, and one person drowned due to the surf. Further inland, two people drowned when a river overflowed its banks, and near Caracas a man died after strong winds toppled a wall. The combination of rainfall and winds destroyed 21 houses and blew off the roof of several others, affecting 1,376 people, of whom 80 were left homeless. Power outages and lack of water were reported. In the country, the hurricane caused 127 injuries, and a death toll reported between three and five. An initial news story reported 28 people missing offshore on three boats.

Moderate wind gusts of up  were reported in Tobago, which downed several trees and caused power outages in seven villages; power was cut to more than 30% of the island. Twenty villages on the island suffered various forms of damage, and at least 45 homes lost their roofs. The hurricane left 22 people homeless and directly impacted about 1,000 people. The hurricane caused one death when a falling tree killed a woman. Some crop damage was also reported, and overall damage on Tobago was estimated at $4.9 million (2004 USD, ($  USD)); damage in neighboring Trinidad was minimal.

High winds blew away roof shingles and produced large swells that battered several coastal facilities. A developing spiral band dropped heavy rainfall over Aruba, causing flooding and $1.1 million worth in structural damage.

Grenada

The airport recorded  of precipitation during the hurricane's passage. Of the nation's six parishes, the four southernmost ones were most severely affected, constituting 80 percent of the total population.

The strong winds impacted more than 14,000 homes on Grenada with 90 percent of the nation's houses damaged and of which 30 percent were destroyed. The capital city of St. George's was severely damaged, where every major building was either damaged or destroyed. Ivan's passage either damaged or destroyed 85 percent of the structures on the island, including the nation's emergency operations center and a 17th-century prison, which allowed many inmates to briefly escape during the height of the storm. The hurricane damaged or destroyed 75 primary or secondary schools, with only two left in working condition. All of Grenada was left without power or running water.

York House, home of the Parliament of Grenada was destroyed.

Tourism was adversely affected; an estimated 60 percent of hotel rooms were damaged. The winds downed 80 percent of the nutmeg trees on the island, with other crop losses varying between 60 and 90 percent. An estimated 18,000 people were left homeless by the hurricane, and about 700 people sustained injuries from the storm. Ivan was considered the worst hurricane to strike the nation since Hurricane Janet in 1955; its passage resulted in 39 fatalities and $1.1 billion in damage (2004 USD, ($  USD), about 200% of its GDP and of which about 45% resulted from housing damage.

Saint Vincent and the Grenadines, Barbados, and northward
Wave heights from the hurricane reached  along coastline portions of Saint Vincent and the Grenadines, which washed away 2 homes; the storm surge destroyed 19 homes and damaged 40 more. On Union Island, the winds damaged the roof of a hospital, while the northern portion of the island sustained heavy damage from the waves. Moderate damage was also reported on Palm Island and Carriacou and Petite Martinique. The winds left more than two-thirds of the island without power, and also damaged the island's banana crop. Damage in the country totaled $40 million (2004 USD, ($  USD).

On the island of Barbados, sustained winds peaked at  while gusts reached , which damaged many trees and roofs. A total of 531 houses were damaged, of which 43 were completely destroyed. Additionally, four hotels sustained some damage. The winds left most of island without electricity, though officials worked quickly to restore the power. Storm surge and wave action caused beach erosion that severely damaged most coastal roads. One death was reported on the island, and damage was estimated at more than $5 million (2004 USD, ($  USD).

Strong winds and rough surf caused moderate coastal damage to southern portions of Saint Lucia; the combination impacted houses near the coast and also led to losses in the banana crop. Minor roof damage was also reported, and damage totalled $2.6 million (2004 USD $  USD)) on the island; three serious injuries were reported on the island due to the hurricane, though no fatalities were reported. In Dominica, winds reached . High waves from Ivan caused light damage to southwestern Martinique and Guadeloupe.

Aftermath
The government of Barbados created a Hurricane Ivan Housing Recovery Project, which repaired or rebuilt 190 houses for people without the available funds; around 90 homes required minor immediate repairs, while the rest required significant reconstruction. The project finished in early 2006 for a total of $5 million (2004 BBD, ($  USD).

Several nearby countries assisted Grenada in its aftermath. The government of Guyana shipped about $250,000 (2004 USD, $40 million 2004 GYD) worth of sugar, as well as 100 members of the Guyana Defense Force to assist in restoring order and reconstruction. The government of Trinidad and Tobago sent 190 policemen, and the government of Anguilla sent 1,230 cases of water. A committee of Caribbean nations realized the local governments could not provide the support that Grenada needed in its aftermath, and thus turned to international assistance. Within a day of Ivan passing to the south of Grenada, the United States Agency for International Development (USAID) deployed 67,600 gallons of water, 500 rolls of plastic sheeting, four 10,000 liter water bladder kits, and a water treatment kit; assistance from USAID totaled $6 million (2004 USD) within a few weeks of the storm's passage, primarily in aid for reconstruction and rehabilitation. In the weeks subsequent to the hurricane, the European Commission Humanitarian aid Office (ECHO) provided €3 million (2004 EUR). By a year later, housing redevelopments and disaster preparation problems continued after being impacted by Hurricane Emily; as a result, the ECHO provided €1.2 million (2005 EUR) to Grenada in September 2005. Nine months after the hurricane, Chinese officials provided assistance in reconstruction and handling foreign debts after meeting with the Grenadian Prime Minister; in 2007, Chinese officials funded the construction of a new $40 million (2007 USD) cricket stadium near St. George's. The Caribbean Development Bank approved a $10 million loan (2004 USD) requested by the government of Grenada in July 2005, which was intended to assist in long-term development of the housing, business, and environmental sectors. Emergency operations in Grenada in coordination with the Pan American Disaster Response Unit ended in July 2005.

Within a few days after the hurricane passed, the Grenada Emergency Operations Center temporarily prevented relief supplies from entering the country to ensure the safety of the incoming items; the decision was reversed shortly thereafter, and planes flew supplies during daylight hours into the reopened airport. Severe looting occurred in the immediate aftermath of Ivan, prompting police officials to enact a curfew for the night hours. In the first week following the hurricane, aid was slow to the affected residents, due to the lack of an efficient aid distribution system. 30 official shelters and 17 prepared ones housed over 5,000 people in the aftermath of the storm. Thousands of people lost their jobs due to the hurricane, with all businesses shut down following the hurricane. By two months after the hurricane struck, 65 schools were opened, some of which serving as shelters; water and power were gradually restored to the island. By a year after the storm's passage, all schools were reopened, and most buildings enacted provisional repairs. Officials determined around 10,000 houses on the island required complete reconstruction, while a further 22,000 needed repairs. The government of Grenada initially planned to rebuild 1,000 houses in the year after the hurricane struck; by June 2005, 260 families were provided houses, with a further 85 under construction. The government also established a Material Assistance Programme, which provided $5,000 (2004 XCD) of free materials to more than 5,000 families, as well as a total of $4.3 million (2004 XCD) in low interest loans to 148 families. Several indirect fatalities occurred in the aftermath of the hurricane, primarily senior citizens.

See also

 List of South America hurricanes

References

2004 in Grenada
2004 in South America
2004 in the Caribbean
Ivan
Lesser Antilles and South America
Ivan Effects
Ivan Effects
Ivan Effects
Ivan Lesser Antilles and South America